Aghora is the self-titled debut album by progressive metal band Aghora, released on March 24, 2000. "Jazz-metal" is another style commonly associated with this band. The album features Sean Reinert and Sean Malone from Cynic.

Track listing
 "Immortal Bliss" – 4:34
 "Satya" – 5:55
 "Transfiguration" – 5:14
 "Frames" – 7:09
 "Mind's Reality" – 4:22
 "Kali Yuga" – 5:37
 "Jivatma" – 11:17
 "Existence" – 6:28
 "Anugraha" – 4:41

Personnel
Danishta Rivero – vocals
Santiago Dobles – lead guitar, coral sitar, programming
Charlie Ekendahl – rhythm guitar
Sean Malone – fretless bass, chapman stick, piano
Sean Reinert – drums, tabla, percussion

References

External links
 Aghora Album Review

2000 albums
Aghora (band) albums